.
The Beagle lands at the Galápagos Islands and Charles Darwin collects the finches which bear his name. 
Carl Jakob Sundevall develops a phylogeny for the birds in Lärobok i zoologien (Handbook of Zoology). This is based on the muscles of the hip and leg.
Frédéric de Lafresnaye describes the magpie mannikin and the cactus wren in Revue et magasin de zoologie (founded by Félix Édouard Guérin-Méneville.
Death of Alexander Collie
Death of Carl Wilhelm Hahn
Alexander von Nordmann describes spotted redshank in Reise um die erde durch Nord-Asien und die beiden oceane in den jahren 1828, 1829 und 1830 ausgeführt 
1835-1839 Philip Barker Webb, Sabin Berthelot and Alfred Moquin-Tandon begin  L'Histoire Naturelle des Îles Canaries published in Paris
Charles Thorold Wood publishes The Ornithological Guide 
Thomas Barwick Lloyd Baker publishes An Ornithological Index
 

Birding and ornithology by year
1835 in science